"A Touch of Gold" is the first television play episode of the second season of the Australian anthology television series Australian Playhouse. "A Touch of Gold" was directed by John Croyston and originally aired on ABC on 12 June 1967 in Melbourne and on 24 July 1967 in Sydney.

Premise
In the 1890s a young woman, Edith, struggles to overcome obstacles.

Cast
 Judith Fisher
 Neva Carr Glynn
 Alexander Archdale
 Elizabeth Pusey

Reception
The Sunday The Sydney Morning Herald said it was "beautifully mounted, superbly cast and was a production that could hold its own anywhere."

The Sydney Morning Herald called it "a stock tale but a competent one."

The Age gave it a mediocre review saying "it didn't have the touches to persuade a viewer this series was going to be madly exciting.

See also
 List of live television plays broadcast on ABC (1950–1969)

References

External links
 
 
 

1967 television plays
1967 Australian television episodes
1960s Australian television plays
Australian Playhouse (season 2) episodes